Peter Pál Pelbart (born 1956) is a Hungarian-born Brazilian philosopher and essayist. He is a professor of philosophy at the Pontifical Catholic University of São Paulo and an essayist of Deleuzian orientation.

Life 
Born in Budapest in 1956, Peter Pál Pelbart moved with his family to Brazil as a child. He trained in philosophy at the University of the Sorbonne and then returned to São Paulo.

The themes of his books revolve around the question of time (the image of time in Gilles Deleuze: O tempo não-reconcilado ), schizophrenia (the relationship between philosophy and madness : Da clausura do fora ao fora da clausura ) and of biopolitics.

He animates and coordinates the Ueinzz theater company made up of psychiatric patients.

From his two experiences, philosophical and schizo-analytical, he theorizes contemporary subjectivities, in particular those ranging from exhaustion to nihilism. He is a member, with Suely Rolnik, of the Center for Research on Subjectivity.

Selected works
 (pt) Da clausura do fora ao fora da clausura, Brasiliense,1989
 (pt) In Nau do tempo-rei, Imago,1994 
 (pt) O tempo não-reconcilado, Perspectiva,1998
 (pt) A Vertigem por um fio: políticas da subjetividade contemporânea, Iluminuras,2000, 222  p.
 (pt) Vida Capital: ensaios de biopolítica, Iluminuras,2003, 252  p.
 (es) Filosofia de la Desercion: Niilismo, Locura y Comunidad, Tinta Limon,2009

References 
 Peter Pál Pelbart
 Cartography of Exhaustion
 Peter Pál Pelbart / Guests // LEFFEST'21 - Lisbon & Sintra Film Festival - 11 to 20 November 2021
 Pál Pelbart

External links

 

1956 births
University of Paris alumni
20th-century Brazilian philosophers
Writers from Budapest
Brazilian essayists
Living people
Hungarian emigrants to Brazil
Brazilian expatriates in France
Academic staff of the Pontifical Catholic University of São Paulo
21st-century Brazilian male writers
20th-century Brazilian male writers
Male essayists